Lorena Ochoa Reyes (born 15 November 1981) is a Mexican former professional golfer who played on the U.S.-based LPGA Tour from 2003 to 2010. She was the top-ranked female golfer in the world for 158 consecutive and total weeks (both are LPGA Tour records), from 23 April 2007 to her retirement on 2 May 2010, at the age of 28 years old. As the first Mexican golfer of either gender to be ranked number one in the world, she is considered the best Mexican golfer and the best Latin American female golfer of all time. Ochoa was inducted into the World Golf Hall of Fame in 2017.

Childhood and amateur career
Born and raised in Guadalajara, Ochoa was the third of four children of a real estate developer and an artist. She took up golf at the age of five, won her first state event at the age of six, and her first national event at seven.

An 11-year-old Ochoa approached the professional Rafael Alarcón, 1979 winner of the Canadian Amateur Championship, as he worked on his game at Guadalajara Country Club, where her family lived near the 10th tee. She asked him if he would help her with her game. Alarcon asked her what her goal was, "She said she wanted to be the best player in the world."

As a junior, she captured 22 state events in Guadalajara and 44 national events in Mexico. She won five consecutive titles at the Junior World Golf Championships and in 2000 she enrolled at the University of Arizona in the U.S. on a golf scholarship, where she was a teammate of fellow freshman Natalie Gulbis. While a student in Tucson, Ochoa received regular tutoring and greatly improved her English by watching movies and reading magazines between practice and tournaments.

She was very successful in women's collegiate golf in the next two years, winning the NCAA Player of the Year Awards for 2001 and 2002, finishing runner-up at both the 2001 and 2002 NCAA National Championship and being named to the National Golf Coaches Association (NGCA) 2001 All-America First team. She won the 2001 Pac-10 Women's Golf Championships, was named Pac-10 Freshman/Newcomer of the Year 2001 and was All-Pac-10 First team in 2001 and 2002.

In her second year she had eight tournament wins in ten events she entered and set an NCAA record with seven consecutive victories in her first seven events. She won the Golfstat Cup in both 2001 and 2002. The Cup is given to the player who has the best scoring average versus par with at least 20 full rounds played during a season. setting the single-season NCAA scoring average record as a freshman at 71.33 and beating her own record the next year by just over a stroke per round with a 70.13 average.

In November 2001, Ochoa was presented with Mexico's National Sports Award by Mexican President Vicente Fox. She was the youngest person and first golfer to receive Mexico's highest sporting accolade. In 2006, she was named NCAA Division I Women's Golf Most Outstanding Student Athlete, an award which was bestowed as part of the 25th Anniversary of Women's Championships celebration, taking into account outstanding performances over the past 25 years. She was the recipient of the 2003 Nancy Lopez Award, which is presented annually to the world's most outstanding female amateur golfer.

Nancy Lopez describes Ochoa off the golf course: "When you meet her for the second time [...] she remembers not only your name, but also the slightest detail from the last time you spoke."

Professional career

Ochoa left college after her second year to turn professional, then won three of ten events played on the 2002 Futures Tour, and topped its money list to earn membership on the LPGA Tour for the 2003 season. She was also Duramed FUTURES Tour Player of the Year.

In her rookie season on the LPGA Tour in 2003, she had eight top-10 finishes, including runner-up finishes at the Wegmans Rochester and Michelob Light Open at Kingsmill, ending the season as the Louise Suggs Rolex Rookie of the Year and ninth on the LPGA official money list. In 2004, she won her first two LPGA Tour titles: the Franklin American Mortgage Championship (where she became the first Mexican born player to win on the LPGA Tour) and the Wachovia LPGA Classic. That same year she placed in the top ten in three of the four major championships.

In 2005, Ochoa won the Wegmans Rochester LPGA. In 2006, her first round score of 62 in the Kraft Nabisco Championship tied the record for lowest score ever by a golfer, male or female, in any major tournament. Her playoff loss to Karrie Webb marked her best finish until 2007 in an LPGA major. By the end of the year she won six tournaments, topped the money list and claimed her first LPGA Tour Player of the Year award which goes to the player who gains the most points throughout the season based on a formula in which points are awarded for top-10 finishes and are doubled at the LPGA's four major championships and at the season-ending ADT Championship. She also won the LPGA Vare Trophy for lowest scoring average on the LPGA Tour.

Her achievements were recognized outside the sport of golf when Ochoa won the 2006 Associated Press Female Athlete of the Year award and received the National Sports Prize for the second time.

In April 2007, Ochoa overtook Annika Sörenstam to become the world number one ranked golfer.

In August 2007, Ochoa won her first major championship at the historic home of golf, the Old Course at St Andrews, with a wire-to-wire win by four shots at the Women's British Open. She won the next two LPGA events, the CN Canadian Women's Open and the Safeway Classic, the first to win three consecutive events since Sörenstam in 2005.

Also in 2007, Ochoa became the first woman ever to earn more than $4,000,000 in a single season, surpassing Sörenstam's previous record of $2,863,904.

In April 2008, Ochoa won her second major championship, this time at the Kraft Nabisco Championship, becoming the first golfer to win consecutive LPGA majors since Sörenstam in 2005. She celebrated this victory in the traditional fashion for the Kraft Nabisco by jumping into the pond on the 18th green. The following week, she won the Corona Championship in her home country by 11 strokes. This gave her the final tournament win she needed to qualify for the World Golf Hall of Fame, although she cannot be inducted until she completes ten seasons on the LPGA Tour.

Ochoa was coached by Rafael Alarcon, a Mexican professional. Alarcon finished second in the 1976 Canadian Amateur Championship, won that title in 1979, then turned professional.

Retirement

On 20 April 2010, Ochoa released a statement indicating her intent to retire from professional golf. At a press conference held in Mexico City on 23 April 2010, Ochoa said her last tournament would be the 2010 Tres Marias Championship to be played from 29 April through 2 May. She said that her career plan had always been to play for "around ten years" and to be the number 1 ranked player in the world. She also said: I just want to be honest with all of you. I went to Asia, and after two or three days of being in Thailand, it was really easy to me – it was really clear to see that I didn't want to be out there, you know. I just was thinking of other things. I wanted to get home. I wanted to start working on the foundation. I wanted to be here close to my family.
Ochoa said she would still maintain her membership in the LPGA and would play in the Lorena Ochoa Invitational and "I'm going to leave the door open in case I want to come back in one or two years to play a U.S. Open or a Kraft Nabisco."

Ochoa made a limited return to competitive golf in 2012, having been invited by her sponsor, Lacoste, to compete in the Lacoste Ladies Open de France, an event on the Ladies European Tour. Ochoa finished the event in T22, 13 shots behind the winner Stacey Keating. Ochoa also announced she would compete in the 2012 edition of her own event, the Lorena Ochoa Invitational.

Tournament host
In November 2008, she became the host of a new annual LPGA event, the Lorena Ochoa Invitational, held at her original home course, Guadalajara Country Club. Proceeds from the tournament help support the Lorena Ochoa Foundation.

Personal life

Lorena Ochoa's successes fuel the family business, the Ochoa Group in Guadalajara, managed by her brother Alejandro Ochoa.

Lorena Ochoa is represented by the Ochoa Sports Management, along with Alarcon and Sophia Sheridan, a Mexican golfer who plays on the LPGA's developmental tour. The Ochoas are confident the list will expand as they attempt to grow the game in Mexico through Ochoa Golf Academies, created by Lorena, Alejandro and Alarcon.

Ochoa Sports Management also operates the LPGA Corona Championship, an annual tour stop in Morelia, Mexico; and the Lorena Ochoa Invitational.

The Lorena Ochoa Foundation operates La Barranca, a primary school in Guadalajara with 250 underprivileged students and an innovative curriculum. In 2008, the foundation opened a high school with 21 freshmen students. The plan, according to foundation director Carmen Bolio, is to add a new class each year and then construct a high school building that's separate from the primary school. She became engaged to her boyfriend Andrés Conesa Labastida, CEO of Aeroméxico, and they married in December 2009. In April 2011, Ochoa announced she was pregnant with the couple's first child. As of mid-2017, she has 3 children.

Professional wins (30)

LPGA Tour (27)

LPGA Tour playoff record (2–5)

Futures Tour (3)

Futures Tour playoff record (0–1)

Major championships

Wins (2)

Results timeline

LA = low amateur
CUT = missed the half-way cut
WD = withdrew
"T" = tied

Summary

Most consecutive cuts made – 17 (2006 Kraft Nabisco – 2010 Kraft Nabisco)
Longest streak of top-10s – 7 (2006 British Open - 2008 LPGA)

LPGA Tour career summary

1 The first three events of 2002 were played as an amateur; missed cut was an injury withdrawal (neck) prior to second round of the 2002 U.S. Women's Open.
2 Ochoa was not included in the final 2010 scoring average rankings; her final event was in early May.

Futures Tour summary

Honors and awards

2001

Mexico National Sports Award (a)

2002

Futures Tour Rookie of the Year
Futures Tour Player of the Year

2003

LPGA Rookie of the Year

2006

Mexico National Sports Award (2)
AP Female Athlete of the Year
Mexico Athlete of the Year
LPGA Rolex Player of the Year
LPGA Tour Money Winner
LPGA Vare Trophy
Golf Writers Association of AmericaFemale Player of the Year

2007

LPGA Rolex Player of the Year (2)
LPGA Tour Money Winner (2)
LPGA Vare Trophy (2)
Women's Sports Foundation Sportswoman of the Year
Glamour Magazine Woman of the Year
Mexico National Sports Award (3)
Golf Writers Association of AmericaFemale Player of the Year (2)
AP Female Athlete of the Year (2)
EFE Sportswoman of the Year
Heather Farr Player Award

2008

Best International Athlete ESPY Award
LPGA Rolex Player of the Year (3)
LPGA Tour Money Winner (3)
LPGA Vare Trophy (3)
Golf Writers Association of AmericaFemale Player of the Year (3)

2009

LPGA Rolex Player of the Year (4)
LPGA Vare Trophy (4)

2011

Bob Jones Award

Team appearances
Amateur
Espirito Santo Trophy (representing Mexico): 1998, 2000

Professional
World Cup (representing Mexico): 2005

See also
List of golfers with most LPGA Tour wins
Statue of Lorena Ochoa, in Puerto Vallarta, Jalisco

Notes and references

External links

 

Lorena Ochoa at ArizonaWildcats.com (archived)

Mexican female golfers
Arizona Wildcats women's golfers
LPGA Tour golfers
Winners of LPGA major golf championships
World Golf Hall of Fame inductees
Sportspeople from Guadalajara, Jalisco
Mexican people of Spanish descent
1981 births
Living people